Ash Grove is a city in Greene County, Missouri, United States. The population was 1,512 at the 2020 census. It is part of the Springfield, Missouri Metropolitan Statistical Area.

History
Ash Grove was laid out in 1853. The city was named from a grove of ash trees near the original town site. A post office called Ash Grove has been in operation since 1849.

The Berry Cemetery, Nathan Boone House, and Gilmore Barn are listed on the National Register of Historic Places.

Geography
Ash Grove is located at  (37.315629, -93.583829).

The city is located approximately twenty miles northwest of Springfield, the state's third-largest city.

Demographics

2010 census
As of the census of 2010, there were 1,472 people, 584 households, and 379 families living in the city. The racial makeup of the city was 97.4% White, 0.1% African American, 0.6% Native American, 0.1% Asian, 0.2% from other races, and 1.6% from two or more races. Hispanic or Latino of any race were 1.8% of the population.

There were 584 households, of which 33.9% had children under the age of 18 living with them, 47.8% were married couples living together, 12.2% had a female householder with no husband present, 5.0% had a male householder with no wife present, and 35.1% were non-families. 31.5% of all households were made up of individuals, and 15.9% had someone living alone who was 65 years of age or older. The average household size was 2.39 and the average family size was 2.96.

The median age in the city was 41.5 years. 24.3% of residents were under the age of 18; 7.2% were between the ages of 18 and 24; 22.6% were from 25 to 44; 25.7% were from 45 to 64; and 20.2% were 65 years of age or older. The gender makeup of the city was 46.8% male and 53.2% female.

2000 census
As of the census of 2000, there were 1,430 people, 577 households, and 386 families living in the city. The population density was 1,204.1 people per square mile (464.0/km2). There were 626 housing units at an average density of 527.1 per square mile (203.1/km2). The racial makeup of the city was 97.69% White, 0.07% African American, 1.05% Native American, 0.07% Asian, 0.42% from other races, and 0.70% from two or more races. Hispanic or Latino of any race were 0.49% of the population.

There were 577 households, out of which 33.8% had children under the age of 18 living with them, 54.9% were married couples living together, 8.1% had a female householder with no husband present, and 33.1% were non-families. 28.8% of all households were made up of individuals, and 16.1% had someone living alone who was 65 years of age or older. The average household size was 2.48 and the average family size was 3.08.

In the city the population was spread out, with 27.7% under the age of 18, 7.9% from 18 to 24, 26.8% from 25 to 44, 21.6% from 45 to 64, and 16.0% who were 65 years of age or older. The median age was 37 years. For every 100 females, there were 94.3 males. For every 100 females age 18 and over, there were 85.0 males.

The median income for a household in the city was $31,250, and the median income for a family was $39,318. Males had a median income of $28,750 versus $20,329 for females. The per capita income for the city was $15,548. About 9.1% of families and 13.4% of the population were below the poverty line, including 15.2% of those under age 18 and 15.2% of those age 65 or over.

Notable people
 Ma Barker, mother of several criminals who ran the Barker gang
 Joseph Yoakum, African American landscape artist
Nathan Boone, veteran of the War of 1812, a delegate to the Missouri constitutional convention in 1820, and a captain in the 1st United States Regiment of Dragoons at the time of its founding, eventually rising to the rank of lieutenant colonel. Nathan was the youngest son of Daniel Boone.

References

External links
Nathan Boone Historic Site Nathan Boone Homestead
 City website
 Ash Grove R-IV Schools
 Historic Sanborn Map of Ash Grove (1893-1921) from University of Missouri Digital Library
Ash Grove Forgotten History Ash Grove Forgotten History

Cities in Greene County, Missouri
Springfield metropolitan area, Missouri
Cities in Missouri